Beckman Coulter Inc. is a Danaher Corporation company that develops, manufactures, and markets products that simplify, automate and innovate complex biomedical testing. It operates in two industries: Diagnostics and Life Sciences. For more than 80 years, Beckman Coulter Inc. has helped healthcare and laboratory professionals, pharmaceutical and biotechnology companies, universities, medical schools, and research institutions worldwide.

The company eventually grew to employ over 12,000 people, with $5.8 billion in annual sales by 2017. It is currently headquartered in Brea, California. Beckman Coulter was acquired by Danaher Corporation in 2011.

History
Founded by Caltech professor Arnold O. Beckman in 1935 as National Technical Laboratories to commercialize a pH meter that he had invented.

In the 1940s, Beckman changed the name to Arnold O. Beckman, Inc. to sell oxygen analyzers, the Helipot precision potentiometer, and spectrophotometers. In the 1950s, the company name changed to Beckman Instruments, Inc.

In 1954, Beckman Instruments acquired ultracentrifuge maker Spinco (Specialized Instruments Corp.). The Spinco division went on to design and manufacture a broad range of laboratory centrifuges.

In 1955, Beckman established the seminal Shockley Semiconductor Laboratory as a division of Beckman Instruments to begin commercializing the semiconductor transistor technology invented by Caltech alumnus William Shockley. Because Shockley's aging mother lived in Palo Alto, California, the Shockley Laboratory was established in nearby Mountain View, California, and thus, "Silicon Valley" was born.

In 1961, Beckman acquired Offner Electronics, a company founded by inventor Franklin F. Offner.

In 1982, the company merged into SmithKline to form SmithKline Beckman, with Arnold Beckman as vice chairman, but regained its independence in 1989 after SmithKline merged with Beecham Group to form SmithKline Beecham (now part of GlaxoSmithKline).

In 1995, the company acquired Hybritech, Inc. from Eli Lilly.

In 1996, the company acquired the Sanofi portion of Sanofi Pasteur Diagnostics.

In 1998, the company acquired Coulter Corporation, a company founded by Wallace H. Coulter, the inventor of the Coulter counter.  Beckman, thereafter, changed its name to Beckman Coulter.

By 2003, the company has more than 200,000 systems operating in laboratories around the world.

In 2005, the company acquired Diagnostic Systems Laboratories (DSL) based in Webster, Texas.

In 2006, the company acquired Lumigen and Agencourt Bioscience.

In 2007, the company acquired the Flow Cytometry Business Group of Dako North America, Inc.

In 2009, the company acquired Lab-based Diagnostics business of Olympus Corporation Japan. That same year, the company moved its world headquarters from Fullerton, California to the newly renovated facility in Brea, California.

In February 2011, Danaher announced that it has entered into a definitive merger agreement with Beckman Coulter. On June 30, 2011, Danaher finalized the acquisition of Beckman Coulter.

On September 12, 2012 Danaher acquired Iris Diagnostics and its parent company IRIS International, Inc. as leader in Urinalysis Diagnostic to further boost Danaher's Diagnostic business within Beckman Coulter.

On February 1, 2015, the company finalized the acquisition of MicroScan from Siemens Healthcare.

On January 3, 2019, Beckman Coulter Life Sciences announced the acquisition of Labcyte, Inc., a privately held manufacturer of acoustic liquid handlers.

On May 2, 2019, Beckman Coulter finalized their acquisition of EDC Biosciences, a privately held manufacturer of acoustic liquid handlers.

Locations

Though each location specializes in distinct areas of the company, many projects are worked on by teams in multiple locations working together remotely. Besides their headquarters in Brea, California, Beckman Coulter serves worldwide & some of the major locations include

USA 
 Atlanta, Georgia 
 Carlsbad, California 
 Chaska, Minnesota
 Danvers, Massachusetts 
 Florence, Kentucky 
 Indianapolis, Indiana
 Irving, Texas 
 Loveland, Colorado 
 Miami, Florida
 Schaumburg, Illinois
 Southfield, Michigan
 West Sacramento, California
 Porterville, California

United Kingdom 
 High Wycombe

Canada 

 Ontario

Germany 
 Krefeld
 Munich, Germany

Italy 
Cassina de' Pecchi

Ireland 
 Clare
 Galway

Switzerland 
 Nyon

Japan 
 Mishima, Shizuoka
 Ariake, Tokyo

Brazil 
 Alphaville, São Paulo
 Palhoça, Santa Catarina

China 

 Suzhou, JiangSu Province
 Dalian, LiaoNing Province
 Shanghai

India 
 Bangalore, Karnataka

Russia 
 Moscow

Turkey 
 Istanbul

South Africa 

 Midrand

Australia 
 Sydney

United Arab Emirates 

 Dubai

Egypt 
 Cairo
 Giza

France 
 Villepinte
 Marseille

New Zealand 
 Auckland

Russia 
 Moscow

Sri Lanka 
 Colombo

Asia Pacific 
 Singapore
 Malaysia
 Vietnam
 Philippines

References

External links
Beckman Coulter Diagnostics
Beckman Coulter Life Sciences
Yahoo! - Beckman Coulter, Inc. Company Profile
Beckman Historical Collection Science History Institute Digital Collections (Digitized corporate records of Beckman Coulter, Incorporated, as well as personal papers of American scientist and industrialist Arnold Orville Beckman)

Electronics companies of the United States
Laboratory equipment manufacturers
Research support companies
Manufacturing companies based in Greater Los Angeles
Companies based in Brea, California
Electronics companies established in 1935
Danaher subsidiaries
Superfund sites in California
1935 establishments in California
2011 mergers and acquisitions